WADB may refer to:

 West African Development Bank
 WADB (AM), a radio station (1310 AM) licensed to Asbury Park, New Jersey, United States
 WRAT, a radio station (95.9 FM) licensed to Point Pleasant, New Jersey, United States, which held the call sign WADB from 1968 to 1996